The 1954–55 Beitar Jerusalem season was the club's 19th season since its establishment, in 1936, and 7th since the establishment of the State of Israel.

During the season, the club competed in Liga Alef (top division) and the State Cup.

Review and events
At the beginning of the season, top Beitar teams, Beitar Tel Aviv and Beitar Jerusalem competed for the Lifa Livyatan Memorial Cup, named after a late Beitar journalist. In the first match, played on 28 August 1954, the teams tied 3–3, and the match was replayed on 12 October 1954, Beitar Tel Aviv winning 5–2.

Match results

Legend

Liga Alef
 
League matches began on 6 February 1955, and by the time the season ended, only 20 rounds of matches were completed, delaying the end of the league season to the next season.

League table (as of 2 July 1955)

Matches

Results by match

State Cup

References

 

Beitar Jerusalem F.C. seasons
Beitar Jerusalem